A triangle piercing is one of several forms of genital piercing applied to the vulva. It is a horizontal piercing that passes from side to side, beneath the base of the clitoral hood tissue where it meets the inner labia and under the clitoris. The name is derived from the tissue where the labia meets the clitoral hood, which looks like a triangle when pinched.

The piercing can increase sexual sensation during direct clitoral stimulation as well as during vaginal or anal penetration. It can stimulate the clitoris from behind, the only genital piercing to do so, although it does not pass through the clitoris or the clitoral shaft. The usual jewellery worn with the piercing is a barbell. There are reports of the piercing alleviating anorgasmia in some individuals.

It is one of the more complicated and expensive genital piercings. The average healing time is 12 to 18 weeks and the triangle piercing is more likely to experience subsequent bleeding than other types of vulva piercings. There are a number of anatomical requirements with regards to the vulva. For instance, the clitoral hood has to protrude outwards from the body for sufficient distance. Most vulvas are not suited to the piercing. Its complexity results from the fact that the piercer has to use mainly tactile rather than visual cues for its placement. It is in a location where mistakes could result in the piercing being misplaced or lead to pain and damage to the vulva. Some people find it to be one of the more painful genital piercings because it passes through so much tissue and so many nerves.

History 
According to PFIQ magazine, the first triangle piercing was performed by Lou Duff of the Gauntlet body piercing studio in the early 1990s. It was subsequently developed by Elayne Angel.

References

External links 
 Body Modification E-Zine (archived copy)

Female genital piercings

fr:Piercing du triangle